Steen Krarup Jensen (born April 12, 1950 in Copenhagen, Denmark) is a Danish sculptor, poet, song writer and social critic. He is educated in sculpture at The Royal Danish Academy of Fine Arts during the period from 1971 to 1978. In 1977 he received Viggo Jarls Legacy.

Steen Krarup Jensen has worked with marble and granite and been experimenting with a lot of other materials in mobiles and assemblages. He is also one of the two inventors of the asphaltophone (see musical road).

Steen Krarup Jensen was the founder of Danske Billedkunstneres Fagforening, a union of Danish sculptors. In connection to that, he became famous in 1981 when he blew up a sculpture with dynamite as a protest against the living conditions of Danish sculptors.

As a writer he has written a large number of texts for variety shows, songs and newspaper chronicles.

In 2007, Steen Krarup Jensen and composer Jakob Freud-Magnus won a Danish contest by writing a suggestion for a new national anthem.

Steen Krarup Jensen is the father of jazz musician Simon Jensen.

References

Sources 
Kunstindeks Danmark & Weilbach Kunstnerleksikons information about Steen Krarup Jensen
Further biographical information about Steen Krarup Jensen (in Danish)
Text and notes (Steen Krarup Jensen/Jacob Freud-Magnus) for the winning song of the national anthem contest
Recording of the winning song (Steen Krarup Jensen/Jacob Freud-Magnus) of the national anthem contest.

Danish sculptors
Artists from Copenhagen
1950 births
Living people
Royal Danish Academy of Fine Arts alumni